Shillong is a hill station and the capital of Meghalaya, a state in northeastern India. It is the headquarters of the East Khasi Hills district. Shillong is the 330th most populous city in India with a population of 143,229 according to the 2011 census. It is said that the rolling hills around the town reminded the British of Scotland. Hence, they would also refer to it as the "Scotland of the East".

Shillong has steadily grown in size since it was made the civil station of the Khasi and Jaintia Hills in 1864 by the British. In 1874, on the formation of Assam as the Chief Commissioner's Province, it was chosen as the headquarters of the new administration because of its convenient location between the Brahmaputra and Surma valleys and more so because the climate of Shillong was much cooler than tropical India. Shillong remained the capital of undivided Assam until the creation of the new state of Meghalaya on 21 January 1972, when Shillong became the capital of Meghalaya, and Assam moved its capital to Dispur in Guwahati.

History
Shillong was capital for composite Assam during the British regime and later till a separate State of Meghalaya was formed. David Scott, the British civil servant of the East India Company, was the Agent of the Governor-General North East Frontier. During the First Anglo-Burmese War the British authorities felt the need for a road to connect Sylhet and Assam. The route was to traverse across the Khasi and Jaintia Hills. David Scott overcame the difficulties his administration faced from the opposition of the Khasi Syiems – their chiefs and people. Impressed by the favourable cool climate of Khasi Hills, they negotiated with the Syiem of Sohra in 1829 for a sanatorium for the British. Thus began the consolidation of British interests in the Khasi-Jaintia Hills.

A serious uprising by the Khasis against foreign occupation of their land followed. It began early in 1829 and continued till January 1833. Eventually, the Khasi confederate chiefs were no match against the military might of the British. David Scott negotiated for the surrender of the leader of the Khasi resistance, Tirot Sing, who was then taken to Dacca (present-day Dhaka) for detention. After the resistance of the Khasis a political agent was posted in the hills, with its headquarters at Sohra, also known by the name Cherrapunjee. But the climatic condition and facilities of Sohra did not make the British happy. They then moved out to Shillong. "Ïewduh" is the biggest market in Shillong. The name "Shillong" was later adopted, as the location of the new town was below the Shillong Peak. Shillong is named after the god of the Khasis, "U Blei Shyllong".

In 1874, a separate Chief Commissionership was formed with Shillong as the seat of administration. The new administration included Sylhet, now a part of Bangladesh. Also included in the Chief Commissionership were the Naga Hills (present-day Nagaland), Lushai Hills (present-day Mizoram) as well as Khasi, Jaintia and Garo Hills. Shillong was the capital of composite Assam till 1969 when the autonomous state of Meghalaya was formed. In January 1972 Meghalaya was made a full-fledged state.

The Shillong Municipal Board has a long history dating back to 1878, when a proclamation was issued constituting Shillong and its suburbs, including the villages of Mawkhar and Laban, into a station under the Bengal Municipal Act of 1876. Inclusion of the villages of Mawkhar (S.E. Mawkhar, Jaiaw and part of Jhalupara and Mawprem) and Laban (Lumparing, Madan laban, Kench's Trace and Rilbong) within the Municipality of Shillong was agreed to by Haiñ Manik Syiem of Mylliem under the agreement of 15 November 1878. But, there is no trace of Shillong in the British era maps dating back to 1878, up to 1900.

Shillong was also the subject of the great earthquake that occurred on 12 June 1897. The earthquake had an estimated moment magnitude of 8.1. Twenty-seven lives from Shillong town alone were lost and a major part of the town was destroyed.

Geography

It lies on the Shillong Plateau, the only major uplifted structure in the northern Indian shield. The city lies in the centre of the plateau and is surrounded by hills, three of which are revered in Khasi tradition: Lum Sohpetbneng, Lum Diengiei, and Lum Shyllong.

Shillong is just  from Guwahati, which can be accessed by road along NH 40, a journey of about 2 hours 30 minutes through lush green hills and the Umiam lake in between.

Smart Cities Mission
Shillong has been selected as the 100th city to receive funding under the centre's flagship "Smart Cities Mission" Atal Mission for Rejuvenation and Urban Transformation AMRUT. In January 2016, 20 cities were announced under the Smart Cities Mission, followed by 13 cities in May 2016, 27 cities in September 2016, 30 cities in June 2017, and 9 cities in January this year. The total proposed investment in the finally selected 100 cities under the Smart Cities Mission would be  2,050,180 million. Under the scheme, each city will get  5000 million from the centre for implementing various projects.

Climate

Weather conditions in Shillong are typically pleasant, pollution-free.

Under Köppen's climate classification the city features a subtropical highland climate (Cwb). Its summers are cool and very rainy, while its winters are cool yet dry. Shillong is subject to vagaries of the monsoon. The monsoons arrive in June and it rains almost until the end of October.

Transport
Although well connected by road, Shillong has neither rail connections nor a proper air connection.

Roadways

Shillong is well connected by roads with all major northeastern states. Three major National Highways pass through:
National Highway 6 (India) – Connected to Guwahati, Tripura and Mizoram
National Highway 106 (India)  - Connected to Nongstoin
National Highway 206 (India)  - Connected to Dawki

Private bus operators, as well as state transport buses from other states, come to and from Shillong daily. Taxi services are also available to destination like Guwahati, Agartala, Kohima, Dimapur, Aizawl and other North Eastern towns and cities.

The Shillong Bypass (pictured) is a two lane road which stretches across  connecting Umiam (NH-40) to Jorabat (NH-44) which then leads to other northeastern Indian states of Mizoram and Tripura.

Airways

Shillong is served by the Shillong Airport, which is located about 30km away at Umroi. The airport has daily flights to and from Kolkata. Presently Indigo is operating regular services from the airport.

Railways
From Byrnihat it will be extended further to Shillong in future.

Demographics

As of the 2011 Census of India, Shillong had a total population of 143,229, of which 70,135 were males and 73,094 were females. As per 2011 language census report, 67,154 of the city's population speak Khasi as their native language, 28,984 speak Bengali, 15,559 speak Hindi, 14,085 speak Nepali, 4,069 speak Assamese, 2,632 speak Punjabi, 3,580 speak Garo, 1,088 speak Urdu and 6,115 speak other languages. Population within the age group of 0 to 6 years was 14,317. The total number of literates in Shillong was 119,642, which constituted 83.5% of the population with male literacy of 84.8% and female literacy of 82.3%. The effective literacy rate of 7+ population of Shillong was 92.8%, of which male literacy rate was 94.8% and female literacy rate was 90.9%. The Scheduled Castes and Scheduled Tribes population was 1,551 and 73,307, respectively. Shillong had 31025 households in 2011. Before creation of Meghalaya 
state in 1972, Non-tribals were majority in Shillong metropolitan area. As per the 1971 Census, non-tribals constituted 58.53% of the population of Shillong back then. 

 
According to 2011 census, Christianity is the dominant religion in the city, practised by 46.49% of the population, followed by Hinduism at 41.95%, Islam 4.89%, and to a lesser degree, that is, 2.01% includes Sikhism, Buddhism and Jainism. An ancient indigenous religion of the Khasi and Jaintia tribes is still followed by 4.5% of the population. The Shillong metropolitan region, which includes the towns of Laitumkhrah, Lawsohtun, Madanrting, Mawlai, Mawpat, Nongkseh, Nongmynsong, Nongthymmai, Pynthorumkhrah, Shillong Cantonment, Umlyngka and Umpling,
had a population of 354,759, 12% of which being under six years of age. The literacy rate in the metro region was 91%.

Places of interest

Tourist sites in and around the city include:
Elephant Falls: 12 km on the outskirts of the city, the mountain stream descends through three successive falls set in dells of fern covered rocks.
Ka Phan Nonglait Park: The park stretches over a kilometre and has an adjacent mini zoo.
Ward's Lake: Known locally as Nan-Polok. It is an artificial lake with garden and boating facilities, built during the colonial era.
Shillong Golf Course: Shillong has one of the largest natural golf courses in Asia: Gleneagles of the East. It enjoys the rare distinction of being one of the few natural golf courses in Asia. Not only is the Shillong Golf Course scenic and enjoyable, it is also challenging. A group of British civil service officers introduced golf to Shillong in 1898 by constructing a nine-hole course. The present 18-hole course was inaugurated in 1924. The course is set in a valley covered with pine and rhododendron trees. The tight fairways, carpeted with a local grass which hardens the soil, are difficult to negotiate. The number of out-of-bounds streams that criss-cross every fairway makes it all the more trying. Obstructions come in the form of bunkers, trees and rain. The longest hole is the 6th, which is a gruelling 594 yards. Shillong Golf Course is considered to be the "Glen Eagle of the East" at the United States Golf Association Museum. It was set in a valley at an altitude of 5,200 ft in 1898 as a nine-hole course and later converted into an 18-hole course in 1924 by Captain Jackson and C. K. Rhodes.
Motphran: The "Monument of France" which is locally known as "Motphran" was erected in memory of the 26th Khasi Labour Corps who served under the British in France during World War I. It bears the words of the Latin poet Horace "Dulce et decorum est pro patria mori" which can be roughly translated as "It is sweet and honourable to die for one's country. Due to government neglect and public apathy, this monument is now in a dilapidated condition standing.
Shillong Peak: A picnic spot, 10 km from the city, 1966 m above sea level, offers a panoramic view of the scenic countryside and is the highest point in the state. Obeisance is paid to U Shyllong at the sanctum sanctorum at the peak's summit every springtime, by the religious priest of Khyrim/Mylliem State.
Capt. Williamson Sangma State Museum: For those interested in ethnic tribal culture and tradition this government museum offers insights to the lifestyle of the people. This museum is in the State Central Library complex where monuments for the great patriots of the state were erected besides the statue of Smt. Indira Gandhi and Netaji Subhash Chandra Bose.
Don Bosco Centre for Indigenous Cultures: The Don Bosco Museum is part of DBCIC (Don Bosco Centre for Indigenous Cultures). DBCIC comprises research on cultures, publications, training, animation programmes and the museum, which is a place of knowledge-sharing on the cultures of the northeast in particular, and of culture in general. DBCIC with its Don Bosco Museum is situated at Mawlai, Shillong.
Wankhar Entomological Museum (Butterfly Museum): A privately owned museum of M/s Wankhar, Riatsamthiah, Shillong about 2 km from police bazar is the only known museum in India devoted to moths and butterflies.
Chrysalis the Gallery: This art gallery is on the second floor of Salonsar Mansion at Police Bazaar, the commercial hub of Shillong. Chrysalis has flexible spacing to display paintings (canvases), sculpture, photography and handicrafts. Run by a local artist, Jaya Kalra, the gallery caters to exhibitions of artists and artisans especially from the northeast and also from the rest of India.
State Museum: Located at the State Central Library complex
Cathedral of Mary Help of Christians is in Don Bosco Square
Bishop and Beadon Falls: Both cascade down the same escarpment into a deep valley
Spread Eagle Falls: 3 km from polo grounds
Sweet Falls: Sweet Falls (also called "Weitdem," in the native dialect) is a waterfall located about 5 km from the Happy Valley and is about 96 m in height.
Crinoline Falls: Near Phan Nonglait Park

Sport

Shillong is one of the capital cities in Northeast India to produce three football clubs that participate in the I-League, namely, Rangdajied United FC, Royal Wahingdoh FC and Shillong Lajong FC. All three have their home stadium at Jawaharlal Nehru Stadium. Royal Wahingdoh FC was adjudged 2nd runners-up in the 2014–15 season of I-League.

The Shillong Golf Course is one of the oldest golf course in the country and is surrounded by pine and rhododendron trees.

Among people of the Khasi tribe of Meghalaya, archery has been both a sport, a form of defence for several centuries and gambling (teer). While modern customs have replaced many of traditional aspects of the culture here, a pervasive fascination for archery remains. Shillong teer is an authorized game that is subject to regulations established by the Meghalaya Amusement and Betting Tax Act. The Khasi Hills Archery Sports Association is in charge of managing this lottery event. 

Binningstar Lyngkhoi from Shillong is a national marathon runner and represented India in the last 2010 Commonwealth Games. He is the fastest marathoner in India with a timing of 2:18 hours.

Education

Autonomous Institutions
North Eastern Indira Gandhi Regional Institute Of Medical Sciences
 Indian Institute of Management
 National Institute of Technology Meghalaya
 National Institute of Fashion Technology, Shillong
 North Eastern Institute of Ayurveda and Homeopathy
 Institute of Hotel Management

General degree colleges
Lady Keane College
Raid Laban College
St. Anthony's College, Shillong
St. Edmund's College
Saint Mary's College
Sankardev College
Seng Khasi College
Shillong College
Shillong Commerce College
Synod College
Women's College, Shillong

Law college
Shillong Law College

Medical College
 North Eastern Indira Gandhi Regional Institute of Health and Medical Sciences

Universities

Central Universities
 English and Foreign Languages University
 North Eastern Hill University (NEHU)
 Indira Gandhi National Open University (IGNOU)

Private Universities
 Martin Luther Christian University
 Techno Global University
 University of Science Technology and Management (USTM, Shillong)
 William Carey University, Meghalaya

Media
Local media in Shillong is strong. There are a number of theatres, newspapers, magazines, local radio and television stations. Shillong is also often called as "India's Rock Capital" due to its inhabitants' great passion for music, hosting concerts featuring a number of western artists.

Cinema
Cinemas in Shillong include Bijou Cinema Hall, Gold Cinema and Anjalee Cinema Hall (also called Galleria Anjalee Cinema).

Print media

Newspapers are published for Shillong both in Khasi and English. Prominent English dailies published here include Shillong Times, Meghalaya Guardian, Highland Post, Meghalaya Times and The Sentinel. Khasi dailies like U Mawphor, U Nongsaiñ Hima Peitngor, Kynjat Shaiamong others are published here. Weekly newspaper are "Salonsar" and "Dongmusa". There are magazines like "Iing Khristan" (100 years of publication), "Pateng Mynta" in Khasi and "Youth Today" and "Eastern Panorama" in English.

Electronic media
The radio industry has expanded with a number of private and government-owned FM channels being introduced. State-owned Doordarshan transmits terrestrial television channels. Apart from these few weekly news channels like Peitngor Cable News (PCN), Ri Khasi Channel, Batesi and T7 are broadcast weekly on the local cable networks.

Communication services
Fixed telephone lines are available. Internet services are available both wired and wireless broadband. It is also well covered in mobile networks with all major cellular providers like Airtel, Vodafone Idea, BSNL and Jio are available here.

Headquarters Eastern Air Command, Indian Air Force
HQ Eastern Air Command (HQ, EAC) was shifted to Shillong on 10 Jun 63 from Kolkata and housed in the old buildings located at Nonglyer village at Upper Shillong, some 10 km from (Lower) Shillong, but at a greater altitude of around 6,000 feet AMSL. Initially a British military base, it was taken over by No. 58 Gorkha Regiment of the Indian Army post Independence in 1947. The Regiment was redeployed after the Sino-Indian War of 1962, making way for the IAF to step in. Only helicopters can operate from HQ, EAC, using a 12.7 hectare (31.3 acre) helipad.

EAC controls air operations in the eastern sector which include West Bengal, Assam, Mizoram and the other eastern states bordering Bangladesh, Burma, and Tibet. EAC comprises permanent airbases at Chabua, Gauhati, Bagdogra, Barrackpore, Hashimara, Jorhat, Kalaikunda and Tezpur with forward airbases at Agartala, Culcutta, Panagarh and Shillong.

Neighbourhoods

Historic neighbourhoods of Shillong include Mawkhar, Jaiaw, Riatsamthiah, Umsohsun, Wahingdoh, Khyndailad (Police Bazar), Mawlai, Laitumkhrah, Laban, Malki, Nongthymmai and Polo.

Notable personalities associated with Shillong

See also
 Tourism in North East India

References

External links

 
Geography of Meghalaya
Hill stations in Meghalaya
 
Cities and towns in East Khasi Hills district
Tourism in Northeast India
1864 establishments in India